DreamWorksTV (also stylized DreamWorks TV and Dtv) is a 2016 television series broadcast in Canada on both Family Channel and Family Chrgd.

Each episode is a compilation of videos originally released as distinct YouTube videos from the YouTube channel with the same name, made by the Universal Studios-owned DreamWorks Animation, introduced by a host. There are twenty-six episodes.

Cast and crew
Overall show
Host: Issac Brown
Director: Alex Hoffman
Writers: Lucas Kavner and Alex Hoffman
Editors: Matt Schneck and Danielle Billeaux
VFX: Evan Bentz
Assistant Editors: Kesleigh Jones and Jamie Klein
Production Supervisor: Danielle Billeaux
Executive Producer: Birkner Rawlings
Producer: Alex Hoffman
Director of Photography: Dawn Shim
Camera Ops: Peter Quenell and Andressa Cor
Sound Mixers: Ian Wellman and Hansel Gonzalez
Line Producer: Brett Hodgson
Production Coordinator: Jeremy Chilvers
Set Teacher: Kelly Shea
Production Assistants: Jean Alvarez and Alex Emmons

The individual segments displayed on the show have different cast and crew for each one.

Recurring characters

Stand-alone:
Po
Puss in Boots
Shrek

Draw My Dream:
Ariana Grande

Gorillaville:
Sargent Bellows AKA "Sarge"
Jane
Claude
Ganto
Bobo
Jeremiah

JBS:
Jimmy
Blue Shorts

Laurie the Lousy Fairy:
Laurie, the fairy girl
Rosie, the goth girl

NTDS:
Mariko Hasebe
Mike Lordan
Tommy Sorenson

OMG
Star Wars
Darth Vader
wrestling family
Elizabeth
Carrie
Alex
Mom
Dad

Public Pool:
Aquina is Saline's friend who ends up dating Mike instead of her
Big Mike
Dinky
Kittenhead, a muscular apprentice life guard with a cat head
Lilith, a blonde girl
Mushka, an orange-haired girl
Saline, a girl with pink hair who has a crush on Mike who dates Kitten

Episodes

Episode 1: Silly Gorillas and Ugly Witches 2 Jan 2016
Shrek: Rapping (mistakenly credited as Kung Fu Panda: How to Speak Action, which occurs in the next episode)
Hopeless Bromantic: Chivalry
Public Pool: Triple Rainbow (described as Triple Rainbow: Public Pool in end credits)
Puss in Boots: How to Translate
Gorillaville: Talking Gorillas Go Bananas
Chicken & the Egg: Exploding Chicken!!!
Kung Fu Panda: Swallowed a Gong
Fifi Cat Therapist: World's Dumbest Dog
Jimmy Blue Shorts: Jimmy vs. Three Ugly Witches Part 1
News That Doesn't Stink: What Happens When You Autotune Your Teacher

Episode 2: Superheroes, Fairies, and Root Beer 3 Jan 2016
Kung Fu Panda: How To Speak Action
Kid Avengers
Laurie the Lousy Fairy: Fairy's First Day
Shrek: Never Floss Again
Draw My Dream: Giants, Dragons, & Root Beer
Rubber Ducky Dynasty
Puss in Boots: How to Look Good
How to do Everything with Garrick & Marvin: How to Draw
Fishsticks & Honeybear: The Most Awkward Phone Call Ever
News That Doesn't Stink: Why is Unicorn so Evil

Episode 3: Unicorns and Kissing Gorillas 9 Jan 2016
Puss in Boots: How to have the best night ever
Know it all Nina: Why are hot dogs called hot dogs?
Astrid Strudelman: The Unicorn Whisperer: I believe in unicorns
OMG: Beard Be Now
Shrek: How to dance like an ogre
New Penguins of Madagascar: How to be a spy with Skipper and Private
Draw my Dream: Jenna & the Ant Queen
Dueling Kapowskis: Wrap Battle
Gorillaville: Kissed by a Gorilla
Grandma's cats are trying to kill her: Pizza Delivery Disaster
News that doesn't stink: Evil Unicorn!

Episode 4: Tooth Fairy in Court and Hamsters in Prison 10 Jan 2016
Shrek: 5 Second Rule Myth
Judge Puppet: Bankrupt Tooth Fairy
Dueling Kapowskis: Brother Sister Smackdown
Kung Fu Panda: Embarrassing Dream Come True
Shrek: Get Your Swag On
Draw My Dream: Bull With Wings on a Kissing Spree (Robert)
Chicken & The Egg: Unexpected Energy Drink Side Effects
Kung Fu Panda: Po's Toy Story
Puss in Boots: Just Dance!
Fifi Cat Therapist: How to be Grumpy Cat
Hamsters With Mustaches Prison Break
News That Doesn't Stink: Pop Star Obsessions! Who Do You Love? / Bad Wookie Impression / How to up your Gamer Game

Episode 5: Pirates and Party Crashers 16 Jan 2016
Puss in Boots: How to translate
OMG: Giant Baby
Public Pool: How to do the nosebomb
Shrek: Donkey Sings!
Draw my Dream: Hydro-blaster Brian vs. Sharknadium
OMG: Derp Vader
Kung Fu Panda: Po's Celebrity Impressions
Moaties: Stetch & Squishy Party Crashers
Jimmy Blue Shorts: Jimmy vs. Angry Pirates Part 1
News That Doesn't Stink: Toilet Paper is Fun (Mike covers Antonio who learned to use the bathroom by himself, Taylor Swift shows up)

Episode 6: Farting Fish and Talking Cats 17 Jan 2016
Kung Fu Panda: How to win Rock, Paper, Scissors
Know it all Nina: Do Fish Fart?
Draw my Dream: Soccer Saves the World from Aliens
Puss in Boots: How to speak Cat
Fifi Cat Therapist: #BobCatProblems
OMG: School Lunch Conspiracy
Shrek: Going Green
How to do Everything with Garrick & Marvin: How to Dance
Fishstick and Honeybear: Honeybear in the Wild
News that Doesn't Stink: Teacher's Secret Powers Revealed

Episode 7: Zombie Shrek and Killer Cats 23 Jan 2016
Shrek: Zombie Shrek
Hopeless Bromantic: Bro's Guide to Getting a Girl's Attention
Draw my Dream: Bull with wings on a kissing spree (Kala)
Kung Fu Panda: Panda gets scared by a ghost story
Gorillaville: Funny Gorilla Prank
OMG: Pro Wrestling Family at Home
Fifi Cat Therapist: #BigDogProblems
Grandma's Cats Are Trying To Kill Her: Deadly Drive to the Vet
News That Doesn't Stink: Olympic Shower Team
News That Doesn't Stink: Very Important News About Your Uncle
News That Doesn't Stink: Minecraft In Real Life

Episode 8: Ugly Selfies and Other Funny Fails 24 Jan 2016
Puss in Boots: Cat Distracted By Light
OMG: Sisbot
Laurie the Lousy Fairy: Elephant in the Room
Shrek: Don't Look! Shrek's Ugliest Selfie
Public Pool: Funny Hair Removal Fail
Chicken & The Egg: ROFLcopter
Kung Fu Panda: Po vs. Belly
Draw My Dream: Slapped in the Face by a Fish (Patrick)
Jimmy Blue Shorts: Angry Pigs in Space
Wonder Wally "The Wall-Eyed Super Hero!"
"You're doing it wrong!!!" Cooking right with Spoony

Episode 9: Jumping Monkeys and Fishy Tales 30 Jan 2016
Kung Fu Panda: How to do kung fu
Know it all Nina: Who invented the selfie?
Draw My Dream: Flying problems with Ariana Grande (Kambri)
Fifi Cat Therapist: Possessed Snake Hears Voices
Puss in Boots: The Fishiest Tale
Trailer Parody: Furious 7 Parody
Gorillaville: 5 Little Monkeys Jumping on the Bed
Shrek: Shrek Shrinks
Jimmy Blue Shorts: Jimmy vs Secret Agent Part 1
News That Doesn't Stink: What does Taylor Swift smell like?

Episode 10: Nightmares, Conspiracies, and the Ultimate Slap Fight 31 Jan 2016
Shrek: Shrek's Worst Nightmare
OMG: Zen Jen
Dueling Kapowskis: The Last Ice Cream Sandwich
Kung Fu Panda: Po's Awesome New Action Figure
How to do everything with Garrick & Marvin: How to make a starburst bracelet
Puss in Boots: Swagger Cat
Fifi Cat Therapist: Guilty Gator
Penguins of Madagascar: Ultimate Slap Fight
Draw My Dream: Barack Obama's Pet Unicorn (Sara Rowe)
News That Doesn't Stink: Justin Bieber is Misunderstood

Episode 11: Exploding Brains and the Fart Patrol 6 Feb 2016
Puss in Boots: Best Gift Ever
OMG: Derp Vader vs. Princess Sleigha
Public Pool: Fart Patrol
Shrek: Would You Rather
Gorillaville: Gorillas Bake a Cake
OMG: Best Worst Cheerleaders Ever
Kung Fu Panda: Po's Brain Explodes
Draw My Dream: Werewolves Bit My Parents (William)
Hamsters With Mustaches: Homemade Helicopter
News That Doesn't Stink: Gullible Girl Who Takes Things a Little Too Seriously (about Pink, uncredited at end)

Episode 12: Sneaky Pandas and Talking Sushi 7 Feb 2016
Kung Fu Panda: Sneaky Panda Guide to Stealth
Know it all Nina: Eyebrow Mustaches
Moaties: Slam Dunk Disguises
Puss in Boots: How to translate
Fifi Cat Therapist: Scaredy Bunny Faces Her Fears
Draw My Dream: Talking Sushi Talent Show (Haley Powell)
Chicken & The Egg: Movie Star Chicken
Shrek: Ogre Reactions
Public Pool: Growing Up Shark
News That Doesn't Stink: Jay Zzz

Episode 13: Huge Action, Big Rescues, and a Cat with Hiccups 13 Feb 2016
Shrek: Shreksomnia
Hopeless Bromantic: Bro's Guide to Poetry
Public Pool: Rescue Me Muscle Boy!
Fifi Cat Therapist: Awkward Giraffe
Draw My Dream: Cybord Jungle Party (Leo)
OMG: How Wrestling Helped Me Win My Spelling Bee
Puss in Boots: Cat Gets the Hiccups
Jimmy Blue Shorts: Jimmy & Suzy Spaceflier
News That Doesn't Stink: Can Pharell and His Magic Hat Save Us All?!

No number confirmed yet, but date and title known:

Episode 14?: Extreme Eating and Other Madness 22 Mar 2016
Puss in Boots: The Paw is Mightier than the Sword
OMG: Seriously
Laurie the Lousy Fairy: Elephant in the Room
Shrek: Shrek Tricks the Poop-arazzi
Draw My Dream: Swallowed by Taylor Lautner (Madysyn Rose)
OMG: Oliver The Really Close Sitter
Kung Fu Panda: Can't Stop Snacking
How to do Everything with Garrick & Marvin: How to Cook
Fifi Cat Therapist: Never Eat Your Patient
Puss in Boots: Cat Facts!!!
News That Doesn't Stink: Aliens Stole My Homework

Episode 15?: Ghosts, Monsters and Mysteries 29 Mar 2016
Kung Fu Panda: Funny Panda Fight
Know It All Nina: Can Ghosts Have Ghosts?
Draw My Dream: Ivan Slays The Cat Dragon (Ivan Mallon)
Puss in Boots: Disappearing Cat Trick
Fifi Cat Therapist: Scared Flightless
Trailer Parody: Star Wars: The Force Awakens
Shrek: Shrek's Doctor... Who?
Gorillaville: Giant Sugar Rush
Public Pool: Secret Mystery River
News That Doesn't Stink: Harry Tongue (Miley Cyrus' tongue and Harry Styles' hair, uncredited)

Episode 16?: Hungry Gummy Bears and Creepy Tadpoles 4 April 2016

Episode 17?: Sassy Girls and Weird Boys 12 April 2016

Episode 18?: Waffle Thief and Bathroom Brawl 19 April 2016

Episode 19: ?

Episode 20: Great Heroes, Greater Heroes, and T... aired 3 May 2016

Episode 21: ? aired 10 May 2016

Episode 22: Space Cats, Cute Cats and Scaredy Cats aired 17 May 2016

Episode 25
Shrek: My Morning Routine
OMG: Zen Jen (starring Lulu Lambros)
Public Pool: Journey to the Bottom of the Pool
Kung Fu Panda: Po's Preposterous Punch
Draw My Dream: Johnny Orlando with special guests Justin Bieber, Austin Mahone & Beyonce
OMG: DIY 
Puss in Boots: How to Make an Entrance
Fifi Cat Therapist: Don't Sleep & Fly
Gorillaville: Goldilocks and the 3 Bears
News That Doesn't Stink: Penguins of Madagascar Movie Review!

Episode 26
Puss in Boots: 25 Fact About Puss in Boots
Know it all Nina: What Are Rainbows Made Of
Draw My Dream: Lauren Orlando in Attack of the Clones
Swamp Talk: Laugh Your Head Off
Fifi Cat Therapist: Dog Gone Crazy
OMG: Jungle Boy
Kung Fu Panda: Levels of Awesomeness
How to do everything with Garrick & Marvin: How to Tie a Tie
Gorillaville: Unga Bunga Boogie
News That Doesn't Stink: Ghosts vs Clowns

Recurring segment series

The following are the names (in alphabetical order) of ongoing series whose individual short episodes have recurred more than once in the DreamWorksTV television series. The segments which have aired are listed in the order which they debuted on the DreamWorksTV television series, which may not reflect their original stand-alone airdates for those which premiered earlier on YouTube. Listed in parenthesis after each segment is the episode number it aired in:

Chicken & The Egg
Unexpected Energy Drink Side Effects (episode 4)
ROFLcopter (episode 8)
Dueling Kapowskis
Wrap Battle (episode 3)
Brother Sister Smackdown (episode 4)
Draw My Dream
Jenna and the Ant Queen (episode 3)
Bull With Wings on a Kissing Spree (episode 4) by Robert
Hydro-blaster Brian vs. Sharknadium (episode 5)
Soccers Saves The World From Aliens (episode 6)
Bull With Wings on a Kissing Spree (episode 7) by Kala
Slapped in the Face by a Fish (episode 8) by Patrick
Fifi Cat Therapist
How to be Grumpy Cat (episode 4)
#BobCatProblems (episode 6)
#BigDogProblems (episode 7)
Gorillaville
Kissed by a Gorilla (episode 3)
Funny Gorilla Prank (episode 7)
Grandma's Cats Are Trying To Kill Her
Pizza Delivery Disaster (episode 3)
Deadly Drive to the Vet (episode 7)
Know It All Nina
Why are hot dogs called hot dogs? (episode 3)
Do Fish Fart? (episode 6)
Jimmy Blue Shorts
Jimmy vs. Angry Pirates Part 1 (episode 5)
Angry Pigs in Space (episode 8) includes Wonder Wally "The Wall-Eyed Super Hero!" and "You're doing it wrong!!!" Cooking right with Spoony
Kung Fu Panda
Embarrassing Dream Come True (episode 4)
Po's Toy Story (episode 4)
Po's Celebrity Impressions (episode 5)
How to win Rock Paper Scissors (episode 6)
Panda Gets Scared By A Ghost Story (episode 7)
Po vs. Belly (episode 8)
Laurie the Lousy Fairy
(episode 2)
Elephant in the Room (episode 8)
News That Doesn't Stink
Evil Unicorn! (episode 3)
Pop Star Obsessions! Who Do You Love? / Bad Wookie Impression / How to up your Gamer Game (episode 4)
Teacher's Secret Powers Revealed (episode 6)
Olympic Shower Team (episode 7)
Very Important News About Your Uncle (episode 7)
Minecraft In Real Life (episode 7)
OMG
Bead Be Now (episode 3)
Giant Baby (episode 5)
Derp Vader (episode 5)
School Lunch Conspiracy (episode 6)
Pro Wrestling Family At Home (episode 7)
Sisbot (episode 8)
Public Pool
How to do the nosebomb (episode 5)
Funny Hair Removal Fail (episode 8)
Puss in Boots
How to have the best night ever (episode 3)
Just Dance! (episode 4)
How to Translate (episode 5)
How to Speak Cat (episode 6)
Cat Distracted By Light (episode 8)
Shrek
How to dance like an ogre (episode 3)
5 Second Rule Myth (episode 4)
Get Your Swag On (episode 4)
Donkey Sings (episode 5)
Going Green (episode 6)
Zombie Shrek (episode 7)
Don't Look! Shrek's Ugliest Selfie (episode 8)

References

External links

2016 Canadian television series debuts
2010s Canadian animated television series
Canadian children's animated adventure television series
Canadian children's animated comedy television series
Canadian children's animated fantasy television series
Canadian computer-animated television series
Family Channel (Canadian TV network) original programming